Stadionul Metalul is a multi-use stadium in Buzău, Romania. It is used mostly for football matches and is the home ground of Metalul Buzău. The stadium holds 1,573 people. In 2019 it was renamed back to "Metalul" after 11 years.

References

Football venues in Romania
Buildings and structures in Buzău County